USS Montgomery (LCS-8) is an  of the United States Navy. She is the fourth ship to be named for Montgomery, the capital of Alabama.

Design

In 2002, the United States Navy initiated a program to develop the first of a fleet of littoral combat ships. The Navy initially ordered two trimaran hulled ships from General Dynamics, which became known as the  after the first ship of the class, . Even-numbered U.S. Navy littoral combat ships are built using the Independence-class trimaran design, while odd-numbered ships are based on a competing design, the conventional monohull . The initial order of littoral combat ships involved a total of four ships, including two of the Independence-class design. On 29 December 2010, the Navy announced that it was awarding Austal USA a contract to build ten additional Independence-class littoral combat ships.

Montgomery is the fourth Independence-class littoral combat ship to be built.

History 
Montgomery was built by Austal USA in Mobile, Alabama. The ship was launched in a ceremony at the Austal shipyards on 6 August 2014. Montgomery was christened on 8 November 2014. The ship was commissioned on 10 September 2016 in Mobile, Alabama. She has been assigned to Littoral Combat Ship Squadron One.

On 13 September 2016, Montgomery experienced two unrelated engineering casualties within a 24-hour period while transiting from Mobile, Alabama to her homeport of San Diego, California. The first casualty happened when the crew detected a seawater leak in the hydraulic cooling system. Later that day, Montgomery experienced a failure with one of her gas turbine engines. Due to the failures, Montgomery headed to Naval Station Mayport for repairs.

On 4 October 2016, a tug collided with Montgomery while the latter was getting underway to avoid Hurricane Matthew. Due to the collision, a crack measuring a foot in length was caused amidships, approximately three feet above the waterline. Five strakes were also bent. Temporary repairs were conducted, and the ship left port as planned.

On 29 October 2016 Montgomery sustained an 18-inch-long crack to her hull while passing through the Panama Canal en route to her homeport in San Diego. Montgomery was traveling from the Atlantic to the Pacific Ocean through the canal's series of locks when she hit the concrete center lock wall while under the control of a local Panama Canal pilot.

During the summer of 2019, the ship was equipped with MQ-8C Fire Scout drones.

Due to mishandling of a sexual harassment complaint, the Navy removed both the commanding and executive officers on 30 December 2021, and announced the executive officer of the  would be placed in temporary command until a permanent replacement could be selected.

On 12 May 2022, the Montgomery tested an AGM-114L Hellfire missile at a land target for the first time in the Pacific Ocean.

References

External links

 Official page 

 

Independence-class littoral combat ships
2014 ships
Maritime incidents in 2016